The 2014 U.S. Virgin Islands gubernatorial election took place on November 4, 2014, to elect the Governor of the United States Virgin Islands. Incumbent Democratic Governor John de Jongh was term-limited and was unable run for re-election to a third term in office. Since no candidate received a majority in the general election, as required by the Revised Organic Act of the Virgin Islands, a runoff was held between Donna Christian-Christensen and Kenneth Mapp, the two top vote receivers. Mapp went on to win the run off in a landslide victory, with almost 64% of the vote.

Democratic primary

Candidates

Won primary
 Donna Christian-Christensen, Delegate to the U.S. House of Representatives

Running mate: Basil Ottley, Jr., former Virgin Islands Senator

Defeated in primary
Adlah Donastorg Jr., former Virgin Islands Senator and candidate for governor in 2006 and 2010
Running mate: Angel A. "Gito" Torres
Gregory Francis, lieutenant governor
Running mate: Patrick Sprauve
Gerard Luz James, former lieutenant governor and candidate for governor in 2002 and 2010
Running mate: Winston Braithwaite
Marvin Pickering, former senior vice president and chief financial officer of Cruzan Rum
Running mate: Calford Martin
Moleto Smith, former deputy and interim/acting commissioner of the Virgin Islands Department of Human Services
Running mate: Hubert Frederick, business executive and former deputy commissioner of the Virgin Islands Department of Health

Results

Independent candidates
Kenneth Mapp, former lieutenant governor and candidate for governor in 2006 and 2010
Running mate: Osbert Potter, former Virgin Islands Senator, former Commissioner of Licensing and Consumer Affairs and former television show host ("Behind the Headlines" on WTJX-TV).

Soraya Diase Coffelt, former Territorial Court Judge
Mona Barnes, first female State Command Sergeant Major of the Virgin Islands
Running mate: Wendy Coram

Sheila Alvin Scallion
Running mate: Robert Quinn

Results

References

External links
St. Croix Source: Candidates for 2014 V.I. Elections
Election System of the Virgin Islands: Listing of Candidates for Primary and General Elections - 2014

United States Virgin Islands
2014 United States Virgin Islands elections